The Pleiades are an open cluster of stars in the constellation Taurus.

Pleiades may also refer to:
 Pleiades (Greek mythology), seven sisters of Greek mythology

Geography
 The Pleiades (volcano group), a group of volcanoes in Antarctica
 Les Pléiades, a mountain in Switzerland

Music
 Pléïades, a composition by Iannis Xenakis
 "Pleiades", a 1989 song by King's X from Gretchen Goes to Nebraska

Other uses
 Alexandrian Pleiad, Greek poets and tragedians in the 3rd century BC
 Pleiades (arcade game), a 1981 arcade game produced by Tehkan and Centuri
 Pleiades (magazine), an American magazine of fiction, poetry, essays, and book reviews
 Pleiades (satellite), an Earth-observation satellite programme operated by CNES 
 Pleiades (supercomputer), a supercomputer at NASA's Ames Research Center
 Pleiades (wine), a wine produced by Sean Thackrey
 The Pleiades, characters in the novel series Overlord by Kugane Maruyama

See also
Bibliothèque de la Pléiade or Pléiade editions, the standard editions of major works of (mostly) French literature published by Éditions Gallimard
 La Pléiade,  a group of 16th-century French Renaissance poets
 Pleiades in folklore and literature, interpretations and traditional meanings of the star cluster among various human cultures